Josef Aloizievitsch Portschinsky (1848–1916), was a Russian entomologist.

References

1848 births
1916 deaths
Russian entomologists
Dipterists
19th-century zoologists from the Russian Empire